La Toma (Spanish: The taking) was a legal declaration made by Don Juan de Oñate on 30 April 1598 in present-day San Elizario, Texas. It stated that Spain was taking possession of all territory north of the Rio Grande for King Philip II of Spain. La Toma was the requerimiento legally justifying Oñate's subsequent conquest of the Pueblo villages as the province of Santa Fe de Nuevo Mexico.

References

Spanish Texas